There are 66 counties in the U.S. state of South Dakota with FIPS codes.

Todd County and Oglala Lakota County are the only counties in South Dakota which do not have their own county seats. Hot Springs in Fall River County serves as the administrative center for Oglala Lakota County. Winner in Tripp County serves as the administrative center for Todd County. These are two of six counties in South Dakota which are entirely within an Indian reservation. (The other four counties are Bennett, Corson, Dewey, and Ziebach.)

South Dakota's postal abbreviation is SD and its FIPS state code is 46.


Table of counties 

|}

Former names 
 Shannon County: renamed Oglala Lakota County in 2015
 Boreman County: Renamed Corson County in 1909
 Mandan County: Renamed Lawrence County
 Pratt County: Renamed Jones County

Former counties 
 Armstrong County (1883–1952): Created by Dakota Territory as Pyatt County in 1883 from Cheyenne, Rusk (Dewey), and Stanley Counties. Renamed Armstrong in 1895. The western half was annexed to form part of the second Ziebach County, in 1911.  The remainder was annexed into Dewey in 1952.
 Ashmore County
 Big Sioux County
 Bramble County   
 Bruguier County
 Burchard County
 Burdick County
 Cheyenne County
 Choteau County: Abolished when it merged into Perkins County along with Martin, Rinehart and Wagner Counties.
 Cole County: organized in 1862, was named for Austin Cole, who was a member of the first Territorial Legislature. Two years later, the boundaries were rearranged and the name changed to Union because of sentiment for the Union side of the civil war. 
 Cragin County
 Delano County: Absorbed by Meade County
 Ewing County  (1889–1890):  Created upon statehood.  Abolished one year later, when it became the northern half of Harding County.
 Forsythe County
 Greely County, South Dakota
 Jayne County
 Lugenbeel County (1875–1909): Created by Dakota Territory from unorganized lands and Meyer and Pratt Counties in 1875. Abolished in 1909 when it became part of Bennett and Todd Counties.
 Martin County: Abolished when it merged into Perkins County along with Choteau, Rinehart and Wagner Counties.
 Meyer County
 Midway County
 Mills County
 Nowlin County (1883–1898): Created by Dakota Territory in 1883 from Cheyenne and White River Counties. Abolished in 1898 when it became part of Haakon County.
 Presho County: Absorbed by Lyman County
 Pyatt County (1883–1895): Created by Dakota Territory from unorganized lands in 1883. Renamed Armstrong in 1895. Later divided between the revived Ziebach County and Dewey County.
 Rinehart County: Abolished when it merged into Perkins County along with Choteau, Martin, and Wagner Counties.
 Rusk County
 Schnasse County (1883–1911): Created by Dakota Territory from unorganized lands and part of Boreman County in 1883. Later absorbed into Boreman and the revived Ziebach Counties
 Scobey County: Absorbed by Meade County
 Sterling County (1883–1911): Created by Dakota Territory from Cheyenne County. Abolished in 1911 when it became part of Haakon and Ziebach Counties
 Stone County
 Thompson County 
 Wagner County: Abolished when it merged into Perkins County along with Choteau, Martin, and Rinehart Counties.
 Washabaugh County (1883–1983): South Dakota's most recent county to be eliminated. Created by Dakota Territory in 1883. Abolished in 1983 when it was merged with Jackson County.
 Washington County (1888–1943): Abolished in 1943 when it was divided between Pennington and Shannon Counties.
  Wetmore County
  White River County
  Wood County
 Ziebach County (1889–1890):  Created in 1889, upon statehood.  Abolished in 1890, becoming the eastern portion of Pennington County.  The name was revived in 1911, when a second Ziebach County was created from parts of Sterling, Schnasse and Pyatt Counties.

Population density map 

Darker colors indicate heavier density.

See also
 List of US counties

References

 
 

South Dakota
List of counties in South Dakota
Counties